Wayne Young (born June 1, 1952) is an American former gymnast. He competed in eight events at the 1976 Summer Olympics.

References

External links
 

1952 births
Living people
American male artistic gymnasts
Olympic gymnasts of the United States
Gymnasts at the 1976 Summer Olympics
People from Lassen County, California
Penn State Nittany Lions men's gymnasts